Capens is a commune in the Haute-Garonne department in southwestern France.

Geography
The village lies on the left banks of the Garonne river, which flows northeast through the middle of the commune.

The commune is bordered by five other communes: Noé to the north, Longages to the northwest, Carbonne to the west, Marquefave to the south, and finally by Montaut to the east.

Population

See also
Communes of the Haute-Garonne department

References

Communes of Haute-Garonne